Earl J. "Hymie" Weiss (born Henryk Wojciechowski; January 25, 1898 – October 11, 1926), was a Polish-American mob boss who became a leader of the Prohibition-era North Side Gang and a bitter rival of Al Capone. He was known as "the only man Al Capone feared".

Early years
Henryk Wojciechowski was born in present-day Sieradz, Congress Poland, to Walenty S. Wojciechowski and Maria Bruszkiewicz. His parents emigrated to the United States in 1901 when Henryk was 3 years old and, upon their arrival in the new country, took the names of William and Mary Weiss. They settled in Buffalo, New York and later moved to an Irish district in the north of Chicago. He had four siblings who survived infancy: Bernard (Bruno), Frederick, Violet and Joseph. Two others died during infancy.

As a teenager, Weiss became a petty criminal. After he upset a fragrance shelf during a botched burglary as a youth, police dubbed him "The Perfume Burglar". He befriended the Irish-American Dean O'Banion. With Weiss and George "Bugs" Moran, O'Banion established the North Side Gang. Around that time Henry started to use the name Earl, a name bestowing the prestige of British earldom onto its holder. The criminal organization they founded eventually controlled bootlegging and other illicit activities in the northern part of Chicago. He was nicknamed "Hymie" and "Hymie the Pole", later in his career. Despite the "Jewish-sounding" moniker he was Polish-Catholic (besides his gun he always carried a rosary). 

First coming into use during Prohibition, the phrase "one way ride" was reportedly first used by Northside Gang member Hymie Weiss, last seen driving off with Steve Wisniewski, a local criminal who had recently hijacked a Northside beer shipment, in July 1921.

Personality
When Weiss's brother Fred was questioned about him in 1926, he replied, "I've seen him once in twenty years... that was when he shot me, six years ago." When photographers tried to snap his picture, Weiss would glare at them and say in a low voice, "You take a picture of me and I'll kill you."

On one occasion, Weiss chased away at gunpoint a deputy U.S. Marshal who came to arrest a friend for violation of the Mann Act at a party he was attending. The marshal returned with reinforcements, arrested the friend, and confiscated a cache of alcohol and weapons. After the raid, Weiss filed a lawsuit to recover silk shirts and socks that he claimed the marshals had stolen; neither the government's charges nor the lawsuit came to anything.

Chicago journalist James O'Donnell Bennett is reputed to have called Weiss “the brainiest leader that North Side boozedom ever had.”

North Side Gang Leader
Dean O'Banion was killed at his headquarters flower shop on November 10, 1924. Weiss succeeded his friend as North Side gang leader and embarked on a campaign of revenge against the Torrio-Capone Gang and the Genna Brothers. Weiss was terminally ill with cancer, which made him heedless of his own safety when conducting bold attacks on Torrio’s gang.

In January 1925, the North Siders shot up Al Capone's car on 55th and State St., missing Capone but wounding members of his entourage. Later that month, Weiss, Moran, and Drucci ambushed Torrio outside his southside home. Torrio was shot several times and left for dead. Torrio survived and recovered in a local hospital. Shortly after this incident, Torrio relinquished control of his gang to Al Capone. After Torrio's flight to New York City, Chicago broke out into a city-wide gang war. Weiss allied his North Side Gang with the Westside O’Donnells, the Saltis-McErlane mob, and the GKW gang.

In August 1926, Weiss and Drucci (with their entourage) were attacked by a contingent of Capone gunmen, including Paul Ricca, who was arrested at the scene. The gun battle took place on South Michigan Avenue, near the Standard Oil Building. The North Side Gang leaders survived the attack, reportedly due in large part to Drucci’s personal efforts in driving off the assailants.

Weiss retaliated against Capone on September 20, 1926. A procession of ten vehicles unloaded gunfire into Capone’s Hawthorne Hotel, on 22nd St. in Cicero. Over 1000 rounds were fired. Police at the time believed Weiss, Drucci, Moran, the Gusenburg brothers, and other North Siders were the gunmen in the attack. Capone was on the premises at the time of the shooting, but was able to flee out of the back of the building during the ambush. Paul Ricca, who was wounded in this attack, reportedly warned Capone and others as the North Side convoy came down the street.

Murder

Jury selection for a murder trial of Joe Saltis, with whom Weiss sought an alliance, began on October 11, 1926 and Weiss and four of his men were sighted there. With him that day were his bodyguard Sam Pellar, gangster Paddy Murray, attorney William W. O'Brien, and Benjamin Jacobs (an investigator for O'Brien). At four o'clock that afternoon, Weiss and his men left for their State Street headquarters, Schofield's Flowers. The quintet parked their cars on Superior Street and rounded the corner to cross State. As they did, two gunmen hidden in a nearby rooming house opened fire with a submachine gun and shotgun. Weiss and Murray were fatally wounded by this first burst. William O'Brien was hit four times and staggered into a nearby stairwell. At the initial sound of gunfire, a panicked Sam Pellar drew his .38 and instinctively fired a shot in the general direction of shooters (this bullet unintentionally struck Weiss as he collapsed onto the sidewalk). Pellar and Jacobs, both wounded, staggered back the way they had come. Bullets followed them the whole way and some chipped the cornerstone of the Holy Name Cathedral directly across the street.

According to the Chicago Police, Jack McGurn was behind the tommy gun that day. Sam “Golf Bag” Hunt, was supporting McGurn from a nearby building, where police found his signature golf bag with a shotgun inside it after the murder. Frank Nitti is credited with masterminding the use of the machine-gun nest in Weiss’ assassination.

Weiss is buried at Mount Carmel Cemetery in Hillside, Illinois, the same place as Al Capone and Dean O'Banion.

He was succeeded as leader of the North Side gang by Vincent Drucci.

In popular culture
Weiss and other Prohibition-era mobsters served as the basis for many gangster films of the 1930s. James Cagney, for example, based his character on both Weiss and Chicago gangland figure Dean O'Banion in The Public Enemy (1931).

In 2013 and 2014, Weiss is portrayed by Will Janowitz on the third and fourth seasons of Boardwalk Empire.

References

Further reading

External links

Hymie Weiss at My Al Capone Museum
HymieWeiss.com

1898 births
1926 deaths
1926 murders in the United States
People from Chicago
People murdered by the Chicago Outfit
Murdered American gangsters
American people of Polish descent
Polish emigrants to the United States
Polish Roman Catholics
North Side Gang
Prohibition-era gangsters
American crime bosses
People murdered in Illinois
Male murder victims
Deaths by firearm in Illinois
Burials at the Bishop's Mausoleum, Mount Carmel Cemetery (Hillside)